Morgan Mill is an unincorporated community on U.S. Route 281 in northeastern Erath County, Texas, United States. It had a population of approximately 206 in 1990.

The four-time World Champion Bull Rider Tuff Hedeman, a friend and colleague of Lane Frost and Cody Lambert, resides in Morgan Mill.

The Morgan Mill Independent School District serves area students.

External links
 Morgan Mill, Texas from the Handbook of Texas Online
 

Unincorporated communities in Texas
Unincorporated communities in Erath County, Texas